The Colhuehuapian age is a period of geologic time (21.0–17.5 Ma) within the Early Miocene epoch of the Neogene, used more specifically within the SALMA classification in South America. It follows the Deseadan and precedes the Santacrucian age.

Etymology 
The age is named after the Colhué Huapí Member of the Sarmiento Formation in the Golfo San Jorge Basin, Patagonia, Argentina.

Formations

Fossils

References

Bibliography 
Colhué Huapí Member
 
 

Abanico Formation
 
 
 
 
 
 

Biblián Formation
 

Castillo Formation
 
 
 
 
 

Cerro Bandera Formation
 
 

Chichinales Formation
 
 

Chilcatay Formation
 
 
 
 
 
 
 
 
 
 

Cura-Mallín Group
 
 
 

Gaiman Formation
 
 

Gran Bajo del Gualicho Formation
 

Monte León Formation
 

Montera Formation
 

Pirabas Formation
 

Río Jeinemení Formation
 

Uitpa Formation
 
 
 
 
 
 
 
 

 
Miocene South America
Neogene Argentina
Mapuche language